Aversion to happiness, also called fear of happiness, is an attitude towards happiness in which individuals may deliberately avoid experiences that invoke positive emotions or happiness.

One of several reasons why fear of happiness may develop is the belief that when one becomes happy, a negative event will soon occur that will taint that happiness, as if punishing that individual for satisfaction. This belief is thought to be more prevalent in Eastern cultures. In Western cultures, such as American culture, "it is almost taken for granted that happiness is one of the most important values guiding people's lives". Western cultures are more driven by an urge to maximize happiness and to minimize sadness. Failing to appear happy often gives cause for concern. The value placed on happiness echoes through Western positive psychology and through research on subjective well-being. Fear of happiness is associated with fragility of happiness beliefs, suggesting that one of the causes of aversion to happiness may be the belief that happiness is unstable and fragile. Research shows that fear of happiness is associated with avoidant and anxious attachment styles. A study found that perfectionistic tendencies, loneliness, a childhood perceived as unhappy, belief in paranormal phenomena, and holding a collectivistic understanding of happiness are positively associated with aversion to happiness.

Cultural factors
Mohsen Joshanloo and Dan Weijers identify four reasons for an aversion to happiness: 

 a belief that happiness will cause bad things to happen
 that happiness will cause you to become a bad person
 that expressing happiness is somehow bad for you and others
 that pursuing happiness is bad for you and others.

For example, "some people—in Western and Eastern cultures—are wary of happiness because they believe that bad things, such as unhappiness, suffering, and death, tend to happen to happy people."

These findings "call into question the notion that happiness is the ultimate goal, a belief echoed in any number of articles and self-help publications about whether certain choices are likely to make you happy". Also, "in cultures that believe worldly happiness to be associated with sin, shallowness, and moral decline will actually feel less satisfied when their lives are (by other standards) going well", so measures of personal happiness cannot simply be considered a yardstick for satisfaction with one's life, and attitudes such as aversion to happiness have important implications for measuring happiness across cultures and ranking nations on happiness scores.

Aversion to happiness can be thought of as a specific example of ideal affect (described by affect valuation theory), whereby cultures vary in the extent to which they value the experience of different emotions.

See also
 Display rules
 Emotions and culture
 History of emotions

References

Positive psychology
Culture
Emotions
Happiness
Phobias